Navoi International Airport  is an airport of entry in Navoi, Uzbekistan. It is named after Ali-Shir Nava'i.

Navoi Airport was opened in 1962 and became the Uzbekistan Airways’ when the national air company was established on 28 January 1992 by the Decree of the President of Republic of Uzbekistan. In 2007, Navoi Airport began capacity enhancement and airfield improvement projects, implementing complete renovation of runway and taxiways, installation of modern lighting system and construction of new air control tower and other facilities.

In 2009, Korean Air Cargo took over the management of the airport and, under the 10-year development plan, further accelerated the modernization programme. Construction of the largest air cargo terminal in Central Asia that can handle 100,000 tonnes of cargo annually using latest equipment has been recently completed and inaugurated on 12 August 2010. The freighter apron has also been constructed to accommodate 5 B747-400 planes and 4 additional fuel tanks were built, which can supply a great deal  of aviation fuel all together and fill up more than 25 B747-400 airplanes. Korean Air inaugurated the 1st cargo flight from Navoi in August 2008 and by increasing the frequency it now operates 12 weekly B747-400F flights to Incheon, Brussels and Milan.

Uzbekistan Airways started cargo operation based in Navoi hub in May 2009 and now operates 18 weekly flights to Bangkok, Delhi, Mumbai and Frankfurt. Navoi Airport now serves 3 airlines flying to 9 cities in 8 countries including passenger flights and the work is underway to create business links with new airlines and set up new routes.

Airlines and destinations

Passenger

Cargo

See also
List of the busiest airports in the former USSR
Transportation in Uzbekistan

References

External links
 

Airports in Uzbekistan
Navoiy Region
Airports built in the Soviet Union